May wine, also known as Maitrank, Maiwein, Maibowle and Waldmeisterbowle, is the name of a German beverage that uses aromatized wine as a base. May wine is served in the spring, traditionally on the May Day holiday. The base is made by steeping the fragrant creeping herb sweet woodruff (Galium odoratum, sometimes called Asperula odorata, known in Germany as Waldmeister) that grows in the forests of Northern Europe in a white German wine.  It is the specialty of the town of Arlon, in the south of Belgium.

Ingredients

Ingredients such as brandy, sparkling wine (or carbonated water) and sugar may also be added to the mixture to flavour the drink and create a punch – hence another common name for the beverage is Maibowle (May punch). Since strawberries are in season at that time of year, they are often floated in the drink.

Commercial production
May wine is also produced commercially. The bottled beverage is meant to simulate the drink described above. It consists of the white-wine base infused with the woodruff herb. Individual variations might include strawberry flavoring or fermentation techniques to make it lightly sparkling.  It is produced in German culture regions of the United States such as Frankenmuth, Michigan. Commercial May wine produced in Germany has been made with artificial flavoring and coloring agents since the 1980s.

Official definition

The Council of the European Communities legally defines Maiwein thus:

See also
Sangria

References

German wine
Cocktails with wine